Eastern Rebellion 3 is an album by Eastern Rebellion led by pianist Cedar Walton which was recorded in late 1979 and released on the Dutch Timeless label.

Reception

AllMusic awarded the album 3 stars.

Track listing 
All compositions by Cedar Walton except as indicated
 "Third Street Blues" – 8:00
 "Never Never Land" (Jule Styne, Betty Comden, Adolph Green) – 6:32    
 "Incognito" – 4:06
 "Seven Minds" (Sam Jones) – 8:45  
 "Clockwise" – 4:56
 "Firm Roots" – 7:32

Personnel 
Cedar Walton – piano 
Curtis Fuller – trombone
Bob Berg – tenor saxophone
Sam Jones – bass
Billy Higgins – drums

References 

Eastern Rebellion albums
1980 albums
Timeless Records albums